Qipengyuania citrea  is a Gram-negative, strictly aerobic, rod-shaped and non-motile bacteria from the genus Qipengyuania which has been isolated from the Bay of Calvi from the Mediterranean Sea near Corsica.

References

Further reading

External links
Type strain of Erythrobacter citreus at BacDive -  the Bacterial Diversity Metadatabase

Sphingomonadales
Bacteria described in 2002